Sir Philip Francis de Zulueta (2 January 1925 – 15 April 1989) was a British diplomat and businessman who served as private secretary for foreign affairs to three successive prime ministers.

Career
The son of Francis de Zulueta, Philip de Zulueta was educated at Beaumont College and New College, Oxford, where his studies were interrupted by World War II in which he served in the Welsh Guards. He entered the Diplomatic Service in 1949 and served in Moscow 1950–52 as private secretary to the Ambassador, Sir David Kelly.

In 1955 de Zulueta was appointed to be a private secretary to the prime minister, Anthony Eden (normally one private secretary is seconded from the Foreign Office; this time there were two, de Zulueta and Guy Millard). He continued in this role under Harold Macmillan and Sir Alec Douglas-Home. He was knighted in 1963 in Macmillan's resignation honours.

De Zulueta resigned from the Foreign Service in 1964 and became a merchant banker. He was a director of Hill Samuel 1965–72 and its chief executive 1973–76. He was chairman of Antony Gibbs Holdings 1976–81.

De Zulueta was a member of the Franco-British Council from 1972 and chairman of its British section from 1981. After his death the French Ambassador wrote to The Times about de Zulueta:
"He was a clear thinking, determined, optimistic and committed friend to whose memory I should like to pay tribute and express my deep gratitude, both in my own name and even more in that of my country."

Personal life
De Zulueta married the Hon. Marie Louise Hennessy, daughter of Lord Windlesham on 14 September 1955. They had two children being Francis de Zulueta and Louise Seligman.

References
Max Egremont, Zulueta, Sir Philip Francis de (1925–1989), rev. Oxford Dictionary of National Biography, Oxford University Press, 2004; online edn, Jan 2011
ZULUETA, Sir Philip Francis de, Who Was Who, A & C Black, 1920–2007; online edn, Oxford University Press, Dec 2012 ; online edn, Nov 2012
Sir Philip De Zulueta: Careers in Downing Street and the City (obituary), The Times, London, 17 April 1989, page 18

External links

1925 births
1989 deaths
Alumni of New College, Oxford
Welsh Guards officers
British Army personnel of World War II
Members of HM Diplomatic Service
British people of Basque descent
English people of Spanish descent
Knights Bachelor
Officiers of the Légion d'honneur
British expatriates in the Soviet Union
British bankers
British Roman Catholics